Gaetano Stammati (4 October 1908 – 11 February 2002) was an Italian politician, lecturer, public executive and banker.

During his career, Stammati has been general manager at the Ministry of the Treasury, board member of IRI, General Accountant of the State, President of the Italian Commercial Bank, Professor of economic policy at the Statistics Faculty of the Sapienza University of Rome and several times Minister in the 70s.

Biography
Stammati was born in Naples in 1908 and graduated in law in 1930.

After a life spent in public administration, in 1976 he was appointed as Minister of Finance in Aldo Moro's government and was elected Senator as independent among the ranks of the Minister in the Italian general elections. He served as Minister of Treasury from 1976 to 1978, Minister of Public works (1978–1979) and Minister of International Trade (1979) in Giulio Andreotti's third, fourth and fifth governments. He was reelected in 1979 Italian general election as senator, but in 1981 was involved in Propaganda Due scandal and retired from politics.

Stammati died in Rome 11 February 2002 when he was 93 years old.

References

1908 births
2002 deaths
Politicians from Naples
Christian Democracy (Italy) politicians
20th-century Italian politicians
Finance ministers of Italy
Senators of Legislature VII of Italy
Senators of Legislature VIII of Italy
Academic staff of the Sapienza University of Rome